Robert Paul is a Canadian figure skater.

Robert Paul may also refer to:
Robert Paul (banker) (1788 - 1866) Director of the Commercial Bank of Scotland
Robert H. Paul (1830–1901), American Old West sheriff
Robert Paul (painter) (1906–1979), Zimbabwean painter
Robert W. Paul (1869–1943), cinema pioneer
Robbie Paul (born 1976), New Zealand international rugby footballer who played in the 1990s and 2000s
Bob Paul (rugby league), New Zealand international rugby league footballer who played the 1970s
Robert Paul (athlete) (1910–1998), French Olympic sprinter
Robert Paul (footballer) (born 1984), German football defender
Robert Bateman Paul (1798–1877), Anglican priest

See also